Kim Se-jin (born January 30, 1974) is a retired volleyball player from South Korea, who currently coaches the Ansan OK Savings Bank in V-League. As a player Kim competed with the South Korean national team from 1992 to 2003 and took part in the 1992, 1996 and 2000 Olympics. At the 1994 World League Kim was honored as best spiker with the 52.08% success percentage in attack (349 successful attacks for 670 attempts). Since 2013, he has been managing the Ansan OK Savings Bank volleyball team as head coach, winning the V-League twice in the 2014-15 and 2015–16 season.

Awards
 1994 FIVB World League "Best Spiker"
 1999 Asian Volleyball Championship "Best Blocker"

References

External links
 Kim Se-jin profile at Sports Reference

1974 births
Living people
South Korean men's volleyball players
Asian Games medalists in volleyball
Volleyball players at the 1992 Summer Olympics
Volleyball players at the 1996 Summer Olympics
Volleyball players at the 2000 Summer Olympics
Volleyball players at the 1994 Asian Games
Volleyball players at the 1998 Asian Games
Volleyball players at the 2002 Asian Games
Hanyang University alumni
Olympic volleyball players of South Korea
Daejeon Samsung Bluefangs players
Asian Games gold medalists for South Korea
Asian Games silver medalists for South Korea
Asian Games bronze medalists for South Korea
Medalists at the 1994 Asian Games
Medalists at the 1998 Asian Games
Medalists at the 2002 Asian Games
South Korean Buddhists
Sportspeople from North Chungcheong Province
21st-century South Korean people
20th-century South Korean people